A constitutional referendum was held in Brazil on 6 January 1963. Voters were asked whether they approved of a constitutional amendment made in 1961 that transferred many of the President's powers to the National Congress. The changes were rejected by over 80% of voters.

Background
Following the resignation of Jânio Quadros on 25 August 1961 and the resistance of the Armed Forces and the upper classes to allowing left-wing Vice-President João Goulart to take office, a serious crisis developed, which almost resulted in a civil war. Goulart, who had been on an official visit to the People's Republic of China, was nearly prevented to return to the country.

Due to Goulart's massive popular support, rather than removing Goulart from office, the National Congress proposed an amendment to the 1946 Constitution, changing the form of government from presidentialism to parliamentarianism, reducing the powers of the President and creating a new post of Prime Minister. The amendment was enacted in September 2, and the military suspended their veto over Goulart, who took office on Independence Day in 1961.

However, the system of government, which had been based on the German model, did not work well, due to the hurry in which the amendment was approved. The ambitions of Goulart and his rivals Juscelino Kubitschek and Carlos Lacerda, both of whom were seeking the Presidency in the forthcoming 1965 elections, also contributed to the failure of parliamentarianism.

In less than two years, there were three Prime Ministers; Tancredo Neves (1961–1962), Brochado da Rocha (July–September 1962) and Hermes Lima (1962–1963).

Result
Voters were asked "Do you approve the Additional Act that institutes the parliamentary system?" ("Aprova o Ato Adicional que institui o parlamentarismo?").

Aftermath

Goulart, having achieved full presidential powers, started his Basic Reforms plan (Reformas de Base), which led to a military coup d'état in April 1964.

References

 A ditadura militar no Brasil, Volume 3 - Jango: Ascenção e queda, p. 72, São Paulo, Caros Amigos Editora, 2007.

Referendums in Brazil
1963 in Brazil
Brazil
Constitutional referendums
Brazil